Joerg Deisinger (born Jörg Deisinger) is a German musician and the former bassist and a founding member of the German 1980s heavy metal band Bonfire.

Early life and Bonfire 

Deisinger was born in Nuremberg, Germany, on 23 April 1966. His pre-teen obsession with learning how to play guitar eventually became a full-fledged pursuit of becoming a rock star. When it became clear he had a genuine chance of realizing his dream, Deisinger quit his apprenticeship as an electrician to devote himself to music full-time.

Deisinger joined German hard rock band as a bassist Cacumen in 1985, which would change its name to Bonfire in May 1986 in the interest of having a catchier moniker to push their new album, Don't Touch the Light. The name was suggested by Deisinger and after some consideration replaced Cacumen. He recorded four albums with the band – Don't Touch the Light (1986), Fireworks (1987), Point Blank (1989), and Knock Out (1991).  During his time with the band touring Europe extensively with acts such as Victory, Krokus, ZZ Top and Judas Priest. They sold almost 750,000 albums over a four-year period even though the North American market failed to embrace Bonfire as Europe had. Deisinger played his last show with Bonfire on 29 July 1994.

On 3 July 1996, a one-time one-payment offer was made by Claus Lessmann and original Bonfire guitarist Hans Ziller to buy the band name back from Deisinger, guitarist Angel Schleifer and drummer Edgar Patrik, as the trio had no desire to resurrect Bonfire.

After Bonfire 
Deisinger went on to record two albums with Paul Sabu (self-titled – 1996, Between the Light – 1998). In 1999 he formed Soul Doctor with Fair Warning singer Tommy Heart, and while the band's 2001 self-titled debut held promise, the 2003 follow-up, Systems Go Wild, suffered from creative differences between Deisinger and Heart. Following its release, Deisinger left the band in April 2003.

In 2003 Deisinger received a Gold record for Bonfire's Fireworks album, which had officially sold 250,000 copies in Germany alone, since its 1987 release.

Deisinger relocated to Thailand in 2004. In addition to doing occasional live gigs as a session player, he opened an English school in Sichon with his girlfriend. In December of that year, the last minute cancellation of a planned Christmas vacation to Koh Phi Phi Don ultimately saved Deisinger's life; the tsunami that decimated parts of Thailand, Indonesia, India, Sri Lanka and Malaysia on 26 December 2004 laid waste to the resort where he was supposed to be staying.

On 17 March 2005 Deisinger returned to Nuremberg, Germany and started working as a freelance photographer, eventually founding Deisinger Photography, which specializes in wedding, travel and event photographs and portfolios.

Fire and Fame 

In 2005 Deisinger approached Canadian music journalist and writer Carl Begai about co-writing his memoirs, which focused on his Bonfire career. The project, eventually dubbed Fire and Fame by Carl, wrapped up in late 2007 and was released independently in August 2008.

Discography

Bonfire

Albums 
 1986: Don't Touch the Light
 1987: Fireworks
 1989: Point Blank
 1991: Knock Out
 1993: Live... The Best

DVD 
 2001: Golden Bullets (DVD, reissue of The Best)

Other 
 1989: Sword and Stone (Shocker soundtrack)

Axel Rudi Pell 
 1989: Wild Obsession

Sabu 
 1996: self-titled
 1998: Between the Light
 2003: Resurfaced

Soul Doctor 
 2001: self-titled
 2002: Systems Go Wild

References

External links 
www.joergdeisinger.com – Deisinger Photography (German)
fireandfame.com – official website of the book Fire and Fame

1966 births
Musicians from Nuremberg
Photographers from Bavaria
Living people
German rock bass guitarists
Male bass guitarists
German memoirists
German male non-fiction writers
German male guitarists